Chandler Fenner (born July 6, 1990) is a professional gridiron football defensive back who is currently a free agent. He was signed by the Kansas City Chiefs as an undrafted free agent in 2012. He played college football at the College of the Holy Cross.

Early years
Fenner attended and played football at Frank W. Cox High School. He was a member of the high school track and field team.

Professional career

Kansas City Chiefs
On April 30, 2012, Fenner signed with the Kansas City Chiefs as an undrafted free agent. 
On August 31, 2012, Fenner was released by the Chiefs.

Seattle Seahawks
On December 7, 2012, Fenner was signed to the Seattle Seahawks to join the practice squad.

On July 29, 2014, the Seahawks released Fenner.

New York Giants
On August 1, 2014, Fenner was signed to the New York Giants. The Giants signed him from to the active roster from their practice squad on October 3, 2014. On September 5, 2015, he was waived by the Giants.

BC Lions
Originally released after training camp on June 18, 2016, Fenner was resigned by the BC Lions on July 24, 2016 to the practice roster. He was promoted to the active roster and first played for the Lions in their Week 12 match against the Montreal Alouettes.

Winnipeg Blue Bombers
On February 13, 2018, Fenner was signed to the Winnipeg Blue Bombers.

References

External links
 Holy Cross bio
 Kansas City Chiefs bio
 New York Giants bio

1990 births
Living people
American football cornerbacks
American players of Canadian football
BC Lions players
Canadian football defensive backs
Holy Cross Crusaders football players
Kansas City Chiefs players
New York Giants players
Players of American football from Virginia
Seattle Seahawks players
Sportspeople from Virginia Beach, Virginia
Winnipeg Blue Bombers players